Gamma Sigma Sigma chapters are the basic organizational divisions of the Gamma Sigma Sigma sorority at accredited U.S. college and university campuses.

Collegiate Chapters
Collegiate chapters of Gamma Sigma Sigma.

a.  Sigma Lambda Phi from University of Miami did not attend the final day of convention. Eta Chapter was reserved for this group. They later joined as Upsilon Chapter in 1958.

Alumni Chapters
Alumni Chapters and Colonies:

Atlanta Metropolitan Alumni Chapter
Bluegrass Alumni Chapter
Cali White Rose Alumni Chapter
Cherry Blossom Alumni Chapter
Delaware Diamonds Alumni Chapter
First Coast Alumni Chapter
Gemini Alumni Chapter
Greater Atlanta Alumni Chapter
Greater Baltimore Alumni Chapter
Greater Garnets Alumni Chapter
Greater Jacksonville Alumni Chapter
Greater New England Alumni Chapter
Houston Bayou Alumni Chapter
Lone Star Alumni Chapter
Louisiana Alumni Chapter
Memphis Pearls Alumni Chapter
Mid-Jersey Shore Alumni Chapter
Nutmeg Alumni Chapter
Omicron Alumni Chapter
Orange Blossom Alumni Chapter
Philadelphia Alumni Chapter
Queen City Alumni Chapter
River Region Garnets and Pearls Alumni Chapter
Sanguine and Pearls Virtual Alumni Chapter
South Florida Alumni Chapter
Southern Pearls Alumni Chapter
Steel Magnolia Alumni Chapter
Sunshine State Alumni Chapter
Twin Cities Alumni Chapter

Alumni Colonies

Inactive Alumni Chapters
Tarheel State Alumni - Chartered 
Tri-State Alumni - Chartered

References

Gamma Sigma Sigma